Vicente Álvarez Areces formed the Areces government on 20 July 1999 after passing the investiture at the General Junta of the Principality of Asturias to form a government as a result of the Asturian Socialist Federation's victory at the 1999 regional election. Areces was nominated again in 2003 and 2007 for a second and third cabinet.

First Areces government (1999–2003)

The First Vicente Álvarez Areces government was the first regional government of Asturias led by President Vicente Álvarez Areces. It was formed in July 1999 after the regional election.

Investiture

Composition

Second Areces government (2003–2007)

The Second Areces government is the incumbent regional government of Asturias led by President Vicente Álvarez Areces. It was formed in July 2003 after the regional election.

Investiture

Composition

Third Areces government (2007–2011)

The Third Areces government was the regional government of Asturias led by President Vicente Álvarez Areces. It was formed in 2007 after the regional election.

In November 2008, he made a restructuring of his government, by changing several Ministries.

Investiture

Composition

References

 

Cabinets established in 1999
Cabinets established in 2003
Cabinets of Asturias
Cabinets established in 2007